The Dubai Fountain is a choreographed fountain system located on the 12 hectare (30 acre) artificial Burj Khalifa Lake, at the center of the Downtown Dubai development in Dubai, United Arab Emirates. It was designed by WET Design, a California-based company also responsible for the fountains at the Bellagio Hotel Lake in Las Vegas. It was built at a cost of AED 800 million (USD $218 million).

The name of the fountain was chosen after a contest organized by the developer Emaar Properties, the result of which was announced on 26 October 2008. Testing of the fountain began in February 2009, and the fountain was officially inaugurated on 8 May 2009 along with the official opening ceremony of The Dubai Mall.

Mechanism

The Dubai Fountain can spray 22,000 gallons (83,000 litres) of water in the air at any moment. More than 6,600 lights and 25 colour projectors have been installed. The fountain contains five circles of different sizes and two arcs. During the end of 2010, a new element was added to the fountain, fire, which outlined the fountains. The fire was temporary for the 2011 New Years celebration. The Dubai Fountains project water in the air in many different combinations and patterns. The beam of light from the fountain can be seen from over 20 miles away.

The Dubai Fountain consists of many high-pressure water jets created by WET, including Shooters, Oarsmen and water robots. These WET Shooters create a loud "boom" noise after water is ejected. The Extreme Shooters are used the least during each show because it takes a lot of time to build up enough pressure and energy to shoot water that high in the air.

Performances

The fountain is animated with performances set to light and music. It is visible from every point on the lake promenade and from many neighbouring structures. Performances take place at 1:00 pm and at 1:30 pm as well as every 30 minutes from 6 pm to 10 pm on weekdays, and from 6 pm to 11 pm on weekends (weekends being Thursday, Friday, and Saturday).

DHL Express premiered an advertising campaign at The Dubai Fountain on 20 October 2011. It was choreographed to a specially reworked version of the Motown classic "Ain't No Mountain High Enough", and was repeated for about a month.

All of the fountain's performances are accompanied by music played through speakers around the lake, although sometimes the fountains are operated without music for testing purposes.

Usage
In March 2016 the fountains and the mall were part of the Expo 2020 logo launch attended by managing director Reem Al Hashimy and prime minister Mohammed bin Rashid Al Maktoum. After the event the fountains danced to Whitney Houston's "I Will Always Love You".

Music 
The responsibility of selecting music to be used in the fountain was given to Peter Kopik, the head of the choreography in WET Design.

See also
 Musical fountain
 Aquanura

References

External links

 How to make a dancing fountain
 on The Dubai mall website.

Buildings and structures in Dubai
Architecture in Dubai
Landscape design history
Fountains in the United Arab Emirates